Fay Ray were a Welsh new wave band who were active from 1979 to 1982. The band formed in Bangor in north-west Wales in 1979 and despite rumours to the contrary were not named after the dog of photographer William Wegman.

The band was signed by producer Nigel Gray to his Surrey Sounds label, and they released a single, "Family Affairs", in 1980.

The single "Family Affairs" was one of three records of the week selected by Lynden Barber in his "Essential Buys" column in Melody Maker; the other two being "Reward" by the Teardrop Explodes and "I'm in Love with a German Film Star" by the Passions. However, as a small independent label, Surrey Sound did not have the distribution network in place to capitalise on this success; it was not in the shops to buy. It did, however help spark the interest of Fred Hyam of Elektra Records. Following a chance meeting with the band's prospective manager at the annual MIDEM record business festival in 1981, Fay Ray were then signed to WEA. The band recorded their debut album Contact You with Gray and it was released in 1982, preceded by the single "(Waiting for the) Heatwave". Two music videos were made for songs from the album, "Heatwave" and "Modern Lovers".

The band also recorded two live performances of "Heatwave" and "Contact You" in summer 1982 at the BBC Television Centre as part of a show made about music in Bangor, Gwynedd by the BBC Community Programmes Unit and The Gwynedd Union of Musicians.

Despite some commercial success in the US and in Europe, including an appearance on episode 71 of Germany's Musikladen (the German equivalent of the UK's Top of the Pops) on 20 May 1982, sales of Contact You in the UK were poor. A second album had already been recorded but was not released when the label dropped the band. Disillusioned with the music business, the band split up shortly afterwards.

In 2018, due to increased attention to their music via the Internet, the band reissued a remastered "Contact You'' on CD with five bonus tracks and new sleeve notes.

Band members
Sheila Macartney – lead vocals, guitar, organ, tambourine
John Lovering – guitar
Jeff Taylor – saxophone, accordion, flute, backing vocals
Tony Travis – bass, backing vocals
Owen Hughes – drums

References

External links
 Discography on Discogs
 Contact You album playlist on YouTube

Musical groups established in 1979
Musical groups disestablished in 1982
Welsh new wave musical groups
Welsh rock music groups
Warner Music Group artists
Elektra Records artists